Pablo Sarabia García (born 11 May 1992) is a Spanish professional footballer who plays for Premier League club Wolverhampton Wanderers and the Spain national team. Mainly an attacking midfielder, he can also play as a right winger.

After playing youth football with Real Madrid, he went on to represent Getafe and Sevilla in La Liga, amassing totals of 232 matches and 36 goals over eight seasons. In July 2019, he signed with French club Paris Saint-Germain, where he would win two Ligue 1 titles and finish as runner-up in the 2020 Champions League, also being loaned to Sporting CP for one year. He joined Wolverhampton Wanderers in January 2023.

Sarabia was a former Spanish youth international. He made his senior debut in 2019, representing the side at Euro 2020 and the 2022 World Cup.

Club career

Real Madrid
Born in Madrid, Sarabia played in the Escuela de Fútbol Madrid Oeste de Boadilla del Monte football academy until 2004, when Real Madrid signed him at the age of 12. After appearing for several of its youth teams, he made his debut in the Segunda División B against Alcorcón on 3 January 2010. He scored his first goal for Real Madrid Castilla two weeks later, in a 5–2 home win over Racing de Santander B.

Sarabia was called up by the first team for the first time in December 2010, for a UEFA Champions League home fixture against Auxerre. He was given number 33 and came on as a substitute for Cristiano Ronaldo in the 72nd minute of a 4–0 group stage victory, on the 8th; after his debut, he stated: "This was a tremendous night that I will never forget".

In his second season with Castilla, manager Alberto Toril assigned Sarabia a greater role in the team, moving him from his usual winger position to attacking midfielder. He responded by scoring 12 goals in the league, third in the squad behind Joselu and Álvaro Morata (14 apiece), as the reserves eventually fell short in the promotion playoffs.

Getafe
On 3 July 2011, Sarabia signed a five-year contract with neighbours Getafe for a reported fee of around €3 million, with Real Madrid having the option to buy him back after two years. After two first slow seasons, he became first choice, scoring his first goal in the top flight on 31 October 2013 to close a 2–0 win at Villarreal.

Sarabia scored a squad-best seven goals in his final campaign at the Coliseum Alfonso Pérez, but Getafe suffered relegation as second-bottom.

Sevilla
Sarabia joined Sevilla on a four-year deal on 9 June 2016. He made his competitive debut for his new club on 14 August, playing 36 minutes in the 0–2 home defeat against Barcelona in the first leg of the Supercopa de España.

In the 2018–19 season, Sarabia scored a career-best 12 goals – behind only Wissam Ben Yedder's 18 in the side – while also providing 13 assists, helping the Andalusians to sixth place.

Paris Saint-Germain

On 2 July 2019, Sarabia signed a five-year contract with Paris Saint-Germain. He scored his first goal in Ligue 1 on 5 October, opening the 4–0 home defeat of Angers and later making two assists.

Sarabia scored the winning penalty in the 2020 Coupe de la Ligue Final against Lyon on 31 July, following a 0–0 draw after 120 minutes. He added six goals in 27 appearances in the domestic league for the runners-up (seven in all competitions).

Loan to Sporting CP
On 1 September 2021, Sarabia joined Portuguese club Sporting CP on a season-long loan. He made his Primeira Liga debut ten days later, replacing Jovane Cabral for the last 30 minutes of the 1–1 draw against Porto. He scored his first goal on 28 November, opening a 2–0 home win over Tondela. 

On 29 January 2022, Sarabia profited from a long ball from his compatriot Pedro Porro to complete a 2–1 comeback victory against Benfica in the final of the Taça da Liga in Leiria. He scored a squad-best 15 times in the league for the runners-up, 21 overall.

Wolverhampton Wanderers
On 17 January 2023, Premier League side Wolverhampton Wanderers announced the transfer of Sarabia on a two-and-a-half-year deal, for a reported €5 million fee. He made his league debut five days later, replacing Adama Traoré at half-time on an eventual 3–0 loss at Manchester City. He made his first start on 4 February, helping the hosts to defeat Liverpool by the same score. He scored his first goal on 24 February, opening the 1–1 draw away to Fulham.

International career
In 2008, Sarabia earned his first cap for the Spain under-16 team. He appeared with the under-17s at the 2009 FIFA World Cup in Nigeria, playing all seven games and scoring once as the national side finished in third place. In 2011, he featured as captain in Spain's campaign in the UEFA European Under-19 Championship, which ended in conquest. 

Sarabia was called up to the full side by manager Robert Moreno on 30 August 2019 for two UEFA Euro 2020 qualifying matches against Romania and Faroe Islands, making his debut in the former match in a 2–1 away victory after replacing Dani Ceballos in the 77th minute – later, he spoke of his "pride" in having achieved this. On 15 November, as a late call-up due to others' injuries, he started a 7–0 home rout of Malta in Cádiz and scored his first international goal for the already qualified Spaniards.

On 24 May 2021, Sarabia was included in Luis Enrique's 24-man squad for Euro 2020. He scored a goal in Spain's final group match, a 5–0 win over Slovakia, adding another in their 5–3 extra time victory against Croatia in the round of 16.

Sarabia was also selected for the 2022 FIFA World Cup in Qatar. His only appearance was as a last-minute substitute in the last-16 match against Morocco, and he missed his attempt in the 3–0 penalty shootout loss.

Career statistics

Club

International

Scores and results list Spain's goal tally first, score column indicates score after each Sarabia goal

Honours
Sevilla
Copa del Rey runner-up: 2017–18
Supercopa de España runner-up: 2016, 2018
UEFA Super Cup runner-up: 2016

Paris Saint-Germain
Ligue 1: 2019–20, 2021–22
Coupe de France: 2019–20, 2020–21
Coupe de la Ligue: 2019–20
Trophée des Champions: 2019, 2020, 2022
UEFA Champions League runner-up: 2019–20

Sporting CP
Taça da Liga: 2021–22

Spain U17
FIFA U-17 World Cup third place: 2009

Spain U19
UEFA European Under-19 Championship: 2011

Spain U21
UEFA European Under-21 Championship: 2013

Spain
UEFA Nations League runner-up: 2020–21

Individual
UEFA La Liga Team of the Season: 2018–19

Notes

References

External links

1992 births
Living people
Spanish footballers
Footballers from Madrid
Association football midfielders
Association football wingers
La Liga players
Segunda División B players
Real Madrid Castilla footballers
Real Madrid CF players
Getafe CF footballers
Sevilla FC players
Ligue 1 players
Paris Saint-Germain F.C. players
Primeira Liga players
Sporting CP footballers
Premier League players
Wolverhampton Wanderers F.C. players
Spain youth international footballers
Spain under-21 international footballers
Spain international footballers
UEFA Euro 2020 players
2022 FIFA World Cup players
Spanish expatriate footballers
Expatriate footballers in France
Expatriate footballers in Portugal
Expatriate footballers in England
Spanish expatriate sportspeople in France
Spanish expatriate sportspeople in Portugal
Spanish expatriate sportspeople in England